Alfredo Arciero (born 10 September 1968) is an Italian film director and screenwriter.

Filmography

Director
Dio c'è (1988)
Family Game (2007)
Il viaggio (2017)

Screenwriter
Dio c'è (1998)
Teste di cocco (2000)
Sei forte, maestro – TV series (2000-2001)
Angelo il custode – TV series (2001)
Promessa d'amore (2004)
Don Matteo – TV series (2006, 2008)
Family Game (2007)
Intelligence - Servizi & segreti – TV series (2009)
Sharm el Sheikh - Un'estate indimenticabile (2010)
Il tredicesimo apostolo - Il prescelto – TV series (2012)
Benvenuti a tavola - Nord vs Sud – TV series (2013)
Squadra antimafia - Palermo oggi – TV series (2014)
Il viaggio (2017)

References

External links
 

1968 births
Living people
People from Caserta
Italian film directors
Italian male screenwriters